Mitrella is a genus of small sea snails, marine gastropod mollusks in the family Columbellidae, the dove shells or dove snails.

Species
According to the World Register of Marine Species (WoRMS), the following species have accepted names and are included within the genus Mitrella 

 Mitrella admodumparva Pelorce, 2020
 Mitrella aemulata Rolán, 2005
 Mitrella aesopiformis K. Monsecour & D. Monsecour, 2016
 Mitrella africana Rolán, 2005
 Mitrella agatha (Melvill, 1904)
 † Mitrela agenta Harzhauser and Kowalke 2002 
 Mitrella albobrunnea Bozzetti, 2020
 Mitrella albocaudata (Smith, 1884)
 Mitrella albofulvata Drivas & Jay, 1990
 Mitrella albomaculata Bozzetti, 2019
 Mitrella albuginosa (Reeve, 1859)
 Mitrella alizonae (Melvill & Standen, 1901)
 Mitrella alofa (Hedley, 1899)
 Mitrella alvarezi Rolán & Luque, 2002
 Mitrella anachisoides Nomura & Nüno, 1940
 † Mitrella anchuela Keen 1943 
 Mitrella angustalineata K. Monsecour & D. Monsecour, 2016
 Mitrella annobonensis Rolán, 2005
 Mitrella antares P. M. Costa & P. J. de Souza, 2001
 Mitrella antelmei (Viader, 1938)
 Mitrella apicata (Smith, 1899)
 Mitrella aranciicoloris K. Monsecour & D. Monsecour, 2011
 Mitrella arcta K. Monsecour & D. Monsecour, 2016
 Mitrella astolensis (Melvill & Standen, 1901)
 Mitrella aurantiaca (Dall, 1871)
 Mitrella australis (Gaskoin, 1852)
 Mitrella austrina (Gaskoin, 1851)
 Mitrella avena (Reeve, 1859)
 Mitrella azpilicuetai Rolán, 2004
 Mitrella baccata (Gaskoin, 1851)
 Mitrella baculus (Reeve, 1859)
 Mitrella bellonae K. Monsecour & D. Monsecour, 2016
 Mitrella bellula Bozzetti, 2019
 Mitrella bicincta (Gould, 1860)
 Mitrella bicinctella Yokoyama, 1928
 Mitrella blanda (G.B. Sowerby, 1844)
 Mitrella boucheti Drivas & Jay, 1990
 Mitrella bouteti K. Monsecour & D. Monsecour, 2018
 Mitrella broderipi (G.B. Sowerby I, 1844)
 Mitrella brookei (Reeve, 1859)
 Mitrella bruggeni van Aartsen, Menkhorst & Gittenberger, 1984
 Mitrella brugneauxae Pelorce, 2020
 Mitrella brunnealineata K. Monsecour & D. Monsecour, 2011
 Mitrella buccinoides (G.B. Sowerby, 1832)
 † Mitrella buccinopsis Lozouet, 1999 
 Mitrella burchardi (Dunker, 1877)
 Mitrella cabofrioensis Costa & de Souza, 2001
 Mitrella canariensis (d'Orbigny, 1840)
 † Mitrella cantaurana Gibson-Smith 1974 
 Mitrella cartwrighti (Melvill, 1897)
 Mitrella caulerpae Keen, 1971
 Mitrella chantalae Bozzetti, 2006
 Mitrella charcoti K. Monsecour & D. Monsecour, 2016
 Mitrella chinoi K. Monsecour & Dekkers, 2013
 Mitrella clementensis (Bartsch, 1927)
 Mitrella coccinea (Philippi, RA, 1836)
 Mitrella condei Rolán, 2005
 Mitrella confusa K. Monsecour & Dekkers, 2013
 Mitrella corbariae Pelorce, 2020
 Mitrella cruenta Pelorce, 2020
 Mitrella cuspidata  Lussi, 2009
 Mitrella cyanae K. Monsecour & D. Monsecour, 2016
 Mitrella dartevelli (Knudsen, 1956)
 Mitrella debitusae K. Monsecour & D. Monsecour, 2016
 † Mitrella debooyi Maury 1917 
 Mitrella deforgesi K. Monsecour & D. Monsecour, 2016
 Mitrella delannoyei (Pelorce, 2013)
 Mitrella delicata (Reeve, 1859)
 Mitrella densilineata (Carpenter, 1864)
 Mitrella denticulata (Duclos, 1835)
 Mitrella desmia (Hervier, 1899)
 Mitrella dichroa (Sowerby I, 1844)
 Mitrella dictua (Tenison Woods, 1878)
 Mitrella dorma Baker, Hanna & Strong, 1938
 Mitrella dupreezae Lussi, 2002
 Mitrella ebisco K. Monsecour & D. Monsecour, 2016
 † Mitrella edensis Richards and Harbison 1947 
 Mitrella elegans (Dall, 1871)
 Mitrella elegantia Pelorce, 2020
 Mitrella elianeae Bozzetti, 2006
 Mitrella eminens (Thiele, 1925)
 † Mitrella epacta Woodring 1964 
 Mitrella essingtonensis (Reeve, 1859)
 Mitrella euterpe (Melvill, 1893)
 Mitrella exilis Bozzetti, 2019
 Mitrella eximia (Reeve, 1846)
 Mitrella expolita K. Monsecour & D. Monsecour, 2016
 Mitrella fimbriata Pelorce & Boyer, 2005
 Mitrella fineti Poppe & Tagaro, 2010
 Mitrella floccata (Reeve, 1859)
 Mitrella fortuita K. Monsecour & D. Monsecour, 2016
 Mitrella franklinensis (Gatliff & Gabriel, 1910)
 Mitrella fuscolineata Pelorce, 2020
 † Mitrella gardnerae Olsson and Harbison 1953 
 Mitrella gausapata (Gould, 1850)
 Mitrella gervillii (Payraudeau, 1826)
 † Mitrella girondica (Peyrot, 1925)
 Mitrella glycochroma Pelorce, 2020
 Mitrella gourgueti K. Monsecour & D. Monsecour, 2015
 Mitrella gracilis K. Monsecour & D. Monsecour, 2016
 Mitrella graevei Kilburn, 1977
 Mitrella granti Lowe, 1935
 Mitrella guanahaniensis Faber, 2004
 Mitrella guerreiroi Rolán, 2001
 Mitrella guttata (G.B. Sowerby I, 1832)
 Mitrella harfordi Strong & Hertlein, 1937
 Mitrella hastata  Lussi, 2002
 Mitrella hayesi  Lussi, 2002
 † Mitrella hayesorum Duerr 2008 
 Mitrella hernandezi Boyer & Rolán, 2005
 Mitrella herosae K. Monsecour & D. Monsecour, 2016
 † Mitrella hilberi Cossmann 1901 
 Mitrella hypodra (Dall, 1916)
 Mitrella impolita (G.B. Sowerby, 1844)
 Mitrella inaccessa K. Monsecour & D. Monsecour, 2016
 Mitrella inaequalis K. Monsecour & D. Monsecour, 2016
 Mitrella incisa Bozzetti, 2019
 † Mitrella inconspicua P. Marshall, 1918 
 Mitrella indifferens (Thiele, 1925)
 Mitrella inesitae Rolán, 2005
 Mitrella inflata Pelorce & Boyer, 2005
 Mitrella innocens (Thiele, 1925)
 Mitrella intermissalineata K. Monsecour & D. Monsecour, 2016
 Mitrella intexta (Gaskoin, 1851)
 Mitrella jacoi Lussi, 2002
 Mitrella jahami K. Monsecour & D. Monsecour, 2011
 Mitrella jayi K. Monsecour & D. Monsecour, 2016
 Mitrella joseantonioi (Espinosa & Ortea, 2014)
 Mitrella kevini Pelorce, 2017
 Mitrella laevior K. Monsecour & D. Monsecour, 2016
 Mitrella lalage Pilsbry & Lowe, 1932
 Mitrella leeannae K. Monsecour & Swinnen, 2019
 Mitrella legrandi (Tenison Woods, 1876)
 Mitrella leucostoma (Gaskoin, 1851)
 Mitrella lignaria (Odhner, 1922)
 † Mitrella limonensis Gabb 1881 
 Mitrella lincolnensis (Reeve, 1859)
 Mitrella lischkei (Smith, 1879)
 † Mitrella llajasensis Squires, 2015 
 Mitrella loisae Pitt & Kohl, 1979
 Mitrella longissima Monsecour & Monsecour, 2007
 Mitrella lorenzi K. Monsecour & D. Monsecour, 2014
 Mitrella loyaltyensis (Hervier, 1899)
 Mitrella macandrewi (G.B. Sowerby, 1905)
  † Mitrella mackayi (Suter, 1917)
 Mitrella maculafasciata K. Monsecour & D. Monsecour, 2016
 Mitrella maestratii K. Monsecour & D. Monsecour, 2011
 Mitrella martensi (Lischke, 1871)
 Mitrella melvilli (Knudsen, 1956)
 Mitrella menkeana (Reeve, 1858)
 Mitrella merita (Brazier, 1877)
 † Mitrella mikra Gardner 1947 
 Mitrella millardi Lussi, 2017
 Mitrella millepunctata (Carpenter, 1864)
 Mitrella mindorensis (Reeve, 1859)
 Mitrella minisipho K. Monsecour & D. Monsecour, 2016
 Mitrella minor (Scacchi, 1836)
 Mitrella moleculina (Duclos, 1840)
 Mitrella monica Bozzetti, 2009
 Mitrella moorea K. Monsecour & D. Monsecour, 2018
 Mitrella nainai K. Monsecour & D. Monsecour, 2018
 † Mitrella nanna Gardner 1947 
 Mitrella natalensis Tomlin, 1926
 Mitrella neocaledonica K. Monsecour & D. Monsecour, 2016
 Mitrella nitidulina (Locard, 1897)
 Mitrella nix K. Monsecour & D. Monsecour, 2016
 Mitrella noel Rolán & Gori, 2009
 Mitrella nomadica (Melvill & Standen, 1901)
 Mitrella nomurai Habe, 1991
 Mitrella nycteis (Duclos, 1846)
 Mitrella nympha (Kiener, 1841)
 Mitrella ocellata (Gmelin, 1791)
 † Mitrella oryzoides Gardner 1947 
 Mitrella pacei (E. A. Smith, 1895)
 † Mitrella parva (Lea, 1841) 
 Mitrella parvicosta K. Monsecour & D. Monsecour, 2016
 † Mitrella parvissima Lozouet, 1999 
 Mitrella patricki Bozzetti, 2006
 † Mitrella paulensis Lozouet, 1999 
 Mitrella pauxillula K. Monsecour & D. Monsecour, 2016
 † Mitrella pedana Gardner 1947 
 Mitrella peregrina K. Monsecour & D. Monsecour, 2016
 Mitrella peroniana (Hedley, 1913)
 † Mitrella peyreirensis (Peyrot, 1925) 
 Mitrella philia (Duclos, 1846)
 † Mitrella phyllisae Duerr 2008 
 Mitrella praetermissa K. Monsecour & D. Monsecour, 2016
 Mitrella profundi (Dall, 1889)
 Mitrella prolixa K. Monsecour & D. Monsecour, 2016
 Mitrella proscripta Smith, 1890
 Mitrella psilla (Duclos, 1846)
 Mitrella pudica Brazier, 1877
 Mitrella pulchrior (Adams, 1852)
 Mitrella pulla Gaskoin, 1852
 Mitrella punctilineata Pelorce, 2020
 Mitrella pungens (Gould, 1860)
 Mitrella pyramidalis (G. B. Sowerby III, 1894)
 Mitrella raphaeli Drivas & Jay, 1990
 Mitrella regnardi (Viader, 1938)
 † Mitrella repens Lozouet, 2015 
 Mitrella reunionensis Drivas & Jay, 1990
 Mitrella rorida (Reeve, 1859)
 Mitrella rosadoi Bozzetti, 1998
 Mitrella rubra (Martens, 1881)
 Mitrella rurutu K. Monsecour & D. Monsecour, 2018
 Mitrella russeli (Brazier, 1874)
 † Mitrella saccoi (Hornung, 1920) 
 Mitrella samueli Pelorce, 2020
 Mitrella sanctaehelenae (E. A. Smith, 1890)
 Mitrella santabarbarensis (Carpenter, 1856)
 Mitrella saotomensis Rolán, 2005
 Mitrella scapula K. Monsecour & D. Monsecour, 2016
 Mitrella scripta (Linnaeus, 1758)
 Mitrella semiconvexa (Lamarck, 1822)
 Mitrella siciliai Rolán & Gori, 2012
 † Mitrella sima Gardner 1947 
 Mitrella simplex (Schepman, 1911)
 † Mitrella solitaria Báldi, 1966 
 Mitrella spelta (Kobelt, 1889)
 Mitrella spiralis K. Monsecour & D. Monsecour, 2011
 Mitrella spiratella (Martens, 1880)
 Mitrella steyni Lussi, 2009
 † Mitrella subfraxa (Harris, 1899) 
 † Mitrella subinflata Lozouet, 2015 
 Mitrella subtilicostata K. Monsecour & D. Monsecour, 2016
 Mitrella suduirauti Monsecour & Monsecour, 2009
 Mitrella supraplicata (E. A. Smith, 1899)
 Mitrella svelta Kobelt, 1889
 Mitrella swinneni K. Monsecour & D. Monsecour, 2011
 † Mitrella tarbelliana Lozouet, 2021
 Mitrella tayloriana (Reeve, 1859)
 Mitrella templadoi Gofas, Luque & Urra, 2019
 Mitrella tenebrosa Rolán, 2005
 Mitrella tosatoi Monsecour & Monsecour, 2006
 † Mitrella tournoueri (Benoist, 1874) 
 Mitrella trivialis K. Monsecour & D. Monsecour, 2016
 Mitrella tuberosa Carpenter, 1856
 Mitrella turbita (Duclos, 1840)
 Mitrella turriculata Yokoyama, 1922
 Mitrella undulata (Schepman, 1911)
  † Mitrella vaporis Lozouet, 2015
 Mitrella vaubani K. Monsecour & D. Monsecour, 2016
 Mitrella ventriosa Pelorce, 2020
 Mitrella verdensis (Knudsen, 1956)
 Mitrella vincta (Tate, 1893)
 Mitrella virginiae Pelorce, 2020
 Mitrella vitrea Pelorce, 2020
 Mitrella vosvictori Monsecour & Monsecour, 2009
 Mitrella xenia (Dall, 1919)
 Mitrella yabei Nomura, 1935

The Indo-Pacific Molluscan Database also includes the following species with names in current use:

 Mitrella agnesiana Melvill & Standen, 1901
 Mitrella biflammata Reeve, 1859
 Mitrella erythraeensis (Sturany, 1900)
 Mitrella nomanensis (Sturany, 1900)
 Mitrella orphia  Duclos, 1846
 Mitrella robillardi (Sowerby, 1894)
 Mitrella terpsichore Sowerby, 1822
 Mitrella tenuis anachisoides Nomura & Niino, 1940
 Mitrella tenuis tenuis (Gaskoin, 1851)
 Mitrella velata Reeve, 1859

 Subgenus Atilia
 Mitrella mariae (Brazier, 1877)
 Mitrella pleurotomoides Pilsbry, 1895

 Subgenus Dentimitrella
 Mitrella acuminata (Menke, 1843)
 Mitrella axiaerata (Verco, 1910)
 Mitrella brunnea (Brazier, 1898)
 Mitrella franklinensis (Gatliff & Gabriel, 1910)
 Mitrella irrorata (Reeve, 1859)
 Mitrella legrandi (Tenison-Woods, 1876)
 Mitrella peroniana Hedley, 1913

 Subgenus Mitrella
  Mitrella alabastroides (Kobelt, 1893)
 Mitrella flexuosa Lamarck, 1822
 Mitrella goubini (Hervier, 1899)
 Mitrella seychellarum (Von Martens, 1904)

 Subgenus Pyreneola
 Mitrella abyssicola (Brazier, 1877)
 Mitrella cincinnata (Von Martens, 1880)
 Mitrella lozoueti Drivas & Jay, 1997
 Mitrella mascarenensis (Drivas & Jay, 1990)
 Mitrella shepstonensis (Smith, 1910)

 Subgenus Zemitrella
 Mitrella jaffaensis (Verco, 1910)
 Mitrella purpureocincta (Verco, 1910)
 Mitrella yorkensis (Crosse, 1865)

 Species brought into synonymy

 Mitrella acuminata (Menke, 1843): synonym of Mitrella menkeana (Reeve, 1858)
 Mitrella albina (Kiener, 1841): synonym of Graphicomassa albina (Kiener, 1841)
 Mitrella albovittata Lopes, Coelho & Cardoso, 1965: synonym of Mokumea albovittata (Lopes, Coelho & Cardoso, 1965)
 Mitrella aradusana Pallary, 1938: synonym of Mitrella coccinea (R.A. Philippi, 1836) 
 Mitrella bella L. A. Reeve, 1859: synonym of Mitrella albuginosa (Reeve, 1859)
 Mitrella callimorpha (Dall, 1919): synonym of Alia callimorpha Dall, 1919
 Mitrella celinae Kosuge, 1980: synonym of Mitromorpha dorcas (Kuroda, Habe & Oyama, 1971)
 Mitrella circumstriata (Schepman, 1911): synonym of Sulcomitrella circumstriata (Schepman, 1911)
 Mitrella conspersa (Gaskoin, 1851): synonym of Indomitrella conspersa (Gaskoin, 1851)
 Mitrella cruentata Mörch, 1860: synonym of Nassarina cruentata (Mörch, 1860)
 Mitrella decollata (Brusina, 1865): synonym of Mitrella gervillei [sic]: synonym of Mitrella gervillii (Payraudeau, 1826)
 Mitrella dissimilis (Stimpson, 1851): synonym of Astyris lunata (Say, 1826)
 Mitrella elegans (Dall, 1871): synonym of Alcira elegans H. Adams, 1861
 Mitrella elegantula Moerch, 1860: synonym of Zafrona pulchella (Blainville, 1829)
 Mitrella flaminea Risso, 1826: synonym of Mitrella scripta (Linnaeus, 1758)
 Mitrella gervillei [sic]: synonym of Mitrella gervillii (Payraudeau, 1826)
 Mitrella hanleyi (Deshayes, 1863): synonym of Mitrella floccata hanleyi (Deshayes, 1863)
 Mitrella haziersensis (Drivas & Jay, 1990): synonym of Indomitrella haziersensis Drivas & Jay, 1990
 Mitrella hidalgoi Monterosato, 1889: synonym of Mitrella broderipi (G.B. Sowerby I, 1844)
 Mitrella kanamaruana Kuroda, 1953: synonym of Sulcomitrella kanamaruana (Kuroda, 1953)
 Mitrella lanceolata (Locard, 1886): synonym of Mitrella svelta Kobelt, 1889 (preoccupied specific name)
 Mitrella leptalea Suter, 1908: synonym of Paxula leptalea (Suter, 1908)
 Mitrella ligula (Duclos, 1835): synonym of Graphicomassa ligula (Duclos, 1840)
 Mitrella livescens (Reeve, 1859): synonym of Euplica livescens (Reeve, 1859)
 Mitrella lunata (Say, 1826): synonym of Astyris lunata (Say, 1826)
 Mitrella maldonadoi Luque, 1984: synonym of Mitrella bruggeni van Aartsen, Menkhorst & Gittenberger, 1984
 Mitrella margarita (Reeve, 1859): synonym of Graphicomassa margarita (Reeve, 1859)
 Mitrella monodonta Habe, 1958: synonym of Sulcomitrella monodonta (Habe, 1958) (basionym)
 Mitrella multilineata (Dall, 1889): synonym of Astyris multilineata (Dall, 1889)
 Mitrella ocellina (Nordsieck, 1975): synonym of Mitrella broderipi (G.B. Sowerby I, 1844)
 Mitrella pallaryi (Dautzenberg, 1927): synonym of Mitrella canariensis (d'Orbigny, 1840)
 Mitrella pseudomarginata Suter, 1908: synonym of Zemitrella pseudomarginata (Suter, 1908)
 Mitrella puella (G.B. Sowerby I, 1844): synonym of Indomitrella puella (G. B. Sowerby I, 1844)
 Mitrella pura (A. E. Verrill, 1882): synonym of Astyris pura A. E. Verrill, 1882
 Mitrella pyramidalis (Sowerby III, 1894): synonym of Columbellopsis pyramidalis (Sowerby III, 1894)
 Mitrella rac (Dautzenberg, 1891): synonym of Mitrella turbita (Duclos, 1840)
 Mitrella rosacea (Gould, 1840): synonym of Astyris rosacea (Gould, 1840)
 Mitrella schepmani Monsecour & Monsecour, 2006: synonym of Indomitrella schepmani (K. Monsecour & D. Monsecour, 2007) (basionym)
 Mitrella stephanophora Suter, 1908: synonym of Zemitrella stephanophora (Suter, 1908)
 Mitrella subantarctica Suter, 1908: synonym of Paxula subantarctica (Suter, 1908)
 Mitrella suzannae Drivas & Jay, 1990: synonym of Pleurifera suzannae (Drivas & Jay, 1990)
 Mitrella syrtiaca Pallary, 1908: synonym of Mitrella scripta (Linnaeus, 1758)
 Mitrella vatovai Coen, 1935: synonym of Mitrella coccinea (Philippi, RA, 1836)
 Mitrella venulata (Sowerby, 1894): synonym of Mitrella nympha (Kiener, 1841)
 Mitrella websteri Suter, 1913: synonym of Zemitrella websteri (Suter, 1913)

References

 Cox, L.R. (1927) Neogene and Quaternary Mollusca from the Zanzibar Protectorate. In Anonymous (Eds.) Report on the Palaeontology of the Zanzibar Protectorate. Government of Zanzibar, Crown Agents for the Colonies, London, pp. 13–102, 171–180, pls. 3–19
 Gofas, S.; Le Renard, J.; Bouchet, P. (2001). "Mollusca", in: Costello, M. J. et al. (ed.) (2001). European register of marine species: a check-list of the marine species in Europe and a bibliography of guides to their identification. Collection Patrimoines Naturels, 50: pp. 180–213.

External links 
 Risso, A. (1826-1827). Histoire naturelle des principales productions de l'Europe Méridionale et particulièrement de celles des environs de Nice et des Alpes Maritimes. Paris, F.G. Levrault. 3(XVI): 1-480, 14 pls
 Hornung, A. (1920). Gastéropodes fossiles du Rio Torsero (Cériale). Pliocène inférieur de la Ligurie. Annali del Museo Civico di Storia Naturale Giacomo Doria. 49 [ser. 3, 9: 70-92, pl. 2]
 Bucquoy E., Dautzenberg P. & Dollfus G. (1882-1886). Les mollusques marins du Roussillon. Tome Ier. Gastropodes. Paris: Baillière & fils. 570 pp., 66 pls. 
  Serge GOFAS, Ángel A. LUQUE, Joan Daniel OLIVER,José TEMPLADO & Alberto SERRA (2021) - The Mollusca of Galicia Bank (NE Atlantic Ocean); European Journal of Taxonomy 785: 1–114
 OBIS Indo-Pacific Molluscan Database